Lolita Žižytė (born 27 July 1998) is a Lithuanian footballer who plays as a defender in Italia femminile calcio Serie C club Venezia FC and the Lithuania women's national team.

Career
Žižytė has been capped for the Lithuania national team, appearing for the team during the 2019 FIFA Women's World Cup qualifying cycle.

References

External links
 
 
 

1998 births
Living people
Women's association football defenders
Lithuanian women's footballers
Lithuania women's international footballers
Gintra Universitetas players